Timmy the Timid Ghost is a fictional comic book ghost, whose adventures were published by Charlton Comics.

Publication history
Timmy the Timid Ghost first appeared as a minor character in an Atomic Mouse story, "3-D Crime Wave" by Al Fago, in Atomic Mouse #5 (November 1953).  

Possibly in response to the popularity of Casper the Friendly Ghost, Timmy later graduated to his own comic book, beginning in Timmy the Timid Ghost #3 (February 1956). The numbering of this series continued from Charlton's Win a Prize #2, as indicated in the Statement of Ownership in issue #4. This series ran until issue #45 (September 1966). 

Timmy returned in a new series in 1967, which ran for 23 issues until 1971. 

In 1985, Timmy the Timid Ghost returned for a brief three-issue run, continuing the numbering from the last series. Issues #24-26 were reprints of previously published stories. This final series was canceled when Charlton Publications closed its comic book division.

See also 
 Homer the Happy Ghost
 List of ghosts

References

External links
Grand Comics Database Project: 1956 series
Grand Comics Database Project: 1967 series
Grand Comics Database Project: 1985 series
Don Markstein's Toonopedia

Charlton Comics characters
Charlton Comics titles
Fictional ghosts
1956 comics debuts
1966 comics endings
1967 comics debuts
1971 comics endings
1985 comics debuts
1985 comics endings
Comics characters introduced in 1956
Humor comics
Fantasy comics